Jack Bass is an American author and journalist. He was born in Columbia, South Carolina to Nathan and Esther (Cohen) Bass in 1934 and grew up in the town of North as the youngest of seven children. He graduated from the University of South Carolina in 1956 with a degree in journalism.

Bass served in the U.S. Navy, attending officer's candidate school in Newport, Rhode Island. He served for three years at Naval Air Station North Island in Coronado, California, as well as in the Philippines. When he resigned from the Navy, he and his family moved to Charleston, South Carolina, where he began his work as a professional journalist. He worked at The News and Courier (Charleston), a co-owned weekly paper, The West Ashley Journal, and The State (Columbia). He received a Nieman Fellowship from Harvard University for 1965–66.

From 1966 to 1973 Bass worked as the Columbia Bureau Chief for The Charlotte Observer as well as a part-time lecturer for journalism at the University of South Carolina. Bass has taught at a number of universities including the University of Mississippi and the College of Charleston.

He was named South Carolina Newspaperman of the Year in 1968 and 1972. His The Transformation of Southern Politics was on the American Library Association's "Notable Books for Adults List" for 1976, and he received a Robert F. Kennedy Book Award for "Taming the Storm" in 1994.

He has three children by his first wife Carolyn McClung Smoak, Kenneth Bass, David Bass and Elizabeth Bass Broadway. He has seven grandchildren.  He is currently married to his third wife, author and television cooking personality Nathalie Dupree, with whom he lives in Charleston.

Bibliography
The Orangeburg Massacre 1970 with Jack Nelson, 
 "Porgy Comes Home" 1972
The Transformation of Southern Politics 1976, with Walter DeVries, 
Unlikely Heroes, 1981 
The American South Comes of Age, 1995, 
Taming the storm: the life and times of Judge Frank M. Johnson and the South's fight over civil rights 1993, 
Ol' Strom 1998 with Marilyn Thompson, 
Strom: The Complicated Personal and Political Life of Strom Thurmond 2005 with Marilyn Thompson, 
The Palmetto State: The Making of Modern South Carolina 2012, with Scott Poole,

References

External links

The Jack Bass Papers are held at the University of South Carolina's South Carolina Political Collections.

American non-fiction writers
Living people
Writers from Columbia, South Carolina
1934 births
University of South Carolina alumni